The 2018 East Tennessee State Buccaneers football team represented East Tennessee State University (ETSU) in the 2018 NCAA Division I FCS football season and were in the third year of their second stint as football members of the Southern Conference (SoCon). They were led by first-year head coach Randy Sanders and played their home games at William B. Greene Jr. Stadium. They finished the season 8–4, 6–2 in SoCon play to win a share of the SoCon championship. They received an at-large bid to the FCS Playoffs, where they lost to Jacksonville State in the first round.

Previous season
The Buccaneers finished the 2017 season 4–7, 2–6 in SoCon play to finish in eighth place.

On December 8, head coach Carl Torbush announced his retirement. He finished at ETSU with a three-year record of 11–22.

Preseason

Preseason media poll
The SoCon released their preseason media poll on July 25, 2018, with the Buccaneers predicted to finish in eighth place. The same day the coaches released their preseason poll with the Buccaneers also predicted to finish in eighth place.

Preseason All-SoCon Teams
The Buccaneers placed five players on the preseason all-SoCon teams.

Offense

2nd team

Matt Pyke – OL

Defense

1st team

Nasir Player – DL

2nd team

Dylan Weigel – DL

Specialists

2nd team

JJ Jerman – K

Quan Harrison – RS

Schedule

 Source:

Game summaries

Mars Hill

at Tennessee

at VMI

Furman

Chattanooga

Gardner–Webb

at The Citadel

at Wofford

Western Carolina

at Mercer

Samford

FCS Playoffs

at Jacksonville State–First Round

Ranking movements

References

East Tennessee State
East Tennessee State Buccaneers football seasons
Southern Conference football champion seasons
East Tennessee State
East Tennessee State Buccaneers football